Tel al-Sultan or Tall as-Sultan is one of eight Palestinian refugee camps in the Gaza Strip. It is located in the Rafah Governorate just north of Rafah city and Rafah Camp. It was established mainly to absorb refugees repatriated from Canada Camp.

UNRWA does not make a distinction between Rafah Camp and Tall as-Sultan. The Palestinian Central Bureau of Statistics 2006 mid-year estimate for Tall as-Sultan is 24,418.

References

Palestinian refugee camps in the Gaza Strip
Rafah Governorate